The 1931 Allan Cup was the Canadian senior ice hockey championship for the 1930–31 season. It was won by the Winnipeg Hockey Club. This team also won the Keane Memorial Cup as Winnipeg's city champions, the Pattinson Cup as Manitoba's provincial champions, as well as the Olympic and world championship held in Lake Placid, New York the following year.

The roster was: Romeo Rivers, Clifford Crowley, George "Tic" Garbutt, Bill Cockburn (Captain), J. Alston "Stoney" Wise, Hugh Sutherland, Victor Lindquist, Billy Bowman (Trainer), Jack Hughes (Coach), W.J. Robertson (Manager), W.R. Bawlf (President), D.G. Thomson (Vice-President), Johnny Myers (Asst. Manager), J. Drake (Trainer), Foster Woolley, Stanley Wagner, Harold "Hack" Simpson, Roy Henkel, and Ken Moore.

The 1913 & 1931 Winnipeg Hockey Club were inducted into the Manitoba Hockey Hall of Fame in the team category.

Final

References

Allan Cup
Allan Cup
Allan Cup 1931
Allan Cup